Philocaleia or Philocalia or Philokaleia was a town on the coast of Pontus Cappadocius, 90 stadia to the east of Argyria, and 100 to the west of Coralla.

Its site is located near modern Görele in Asiatic Turkey.

References

Populated places in ancient Pontus
Former populated places in Turkey
History of Giresun Province